The striated earthcreeper (Geocerthia serrana) is a species of bird in the family Furnariidae. It is monotypic within Geocerthia, but has traditionally been included in Upucerthia. The two genera are not particularly close. The striated earthcreeper is found in woodland and shrub in the Andean highlands of western Peru.

References

striated earthcreeper
Birds of the Peruvian Andes
Endemic birds of Peru
striated earthcreeper
striated earthcreeper
Taxonomy articles created by Polbot